Qaleh-ye Juq Zamani (also Romanized as Qal‘eh-ye Jūq Zamānī and Qal‘eh Jūq-e Zamānī; also known as Ghal’eh Jooghé Zamani, Oal‘eh Jūq, and Qal‘eh Jūq) is a village in Boghrati Rural District, Sardrud District, Razan County, Hamadan Province, Iran. At the 2006 census, its population was 471, in 106 families.

References 

Populated places in Razan County